Toshiko Akiyoshi Plays Gershwin's "Porgy and Bess" is a 2016 recording by jazz pianist Toshiko Akiyoshi.

Track listing
"Summertime"  
"I Got Plenty o' Nuttin'"
"I Loves You, Porgy"  
"My Man's Gone Now"  
"A Woman Is A Sometime Thing"  
"It Ain't Necessarily So"  
"Bess, You Is My Woman Now"  
"Bess, O Where's My Bess"  
"A Red-Haired Woman"

all music composed by George Gershwin

Personnel
Toshiko Akiyoshi – piano 
Paul Gill – bass (tracks 2, 8, 9)
Yasushi Nakamura (中村 恭士) – bass (tracks 5, 6, 7)
George Mraz – bass (tracks 3, 4)
Mark Taylor – drums (tracks 4~8)
Rodney Green – drums (tracks 2, 9)

References

Studio Songs YZSO 10065
jazzdisco.org
catfish-records.jp

Toshiko Akiyoshi albums
2016 albums